The following is a list of players, both past and current, who appeared at least in one game for the Taoyuan Leopards (2021–present) franchise.



Players

C

D

E

G

H

K

L

M

O

S

T

W

X

Y

References

T1 League all-time rosters